Bohodukhiv Raion is a raion (district) in Kharkiv Oblast of Ukraine. Its administrative center is the town of Bohodukhiv. Population: 

On 18 July 2020, as part of the administrative reform of Ukraine, the number of raions of Kharkiv Oblast was reduced to seven, and the area of Bohodukhiv Raion was significantly expanded.  The January 2020 estimate of the raion population was

Subdivisions

Current
After the reform in July 2020, the raion consisted of 5 hromadas:
 Bohodukhiv urban hromada with the administration in the city of Bohodukhiv, retained from Bohodukhiv Raion;
 Kolomak settlement hromada with the administration in the urban-type settlement of Kolomak, transferred from Kolomak Raion;
 Krasnokutsk settlement hromada with the administration in the urban-type settlement of Krasnokutsk, transferred from Krasnokutsk Raion;
 Valky urban hromada with the administration in the city of Valky, transferred from Valky Raion;
 Zolochiv settlement hromada with the administration in the urban-type settlement of Zolochiv, transferred from Zolochiv Raion.

Before 2020

Before the 2020 reform, the raion consisted of one hromada, Bohodukhiv urban hromada with the administration in Bohodukhiv.

References 

Raions of Kharkiv Oblast
1923 establishments in Ukraine
Bohodukhiv Raion